Frank Mazzuca may refer to:

Frank Mazzuca (American politician) (1905–1969), state legislator in Missouri
Frank Mazzuca (Canadian politician) (1922–2009), local politician in Sudbury, Ontario, Canada